Milton Locks is a   nature reserve in Milton in Hampshire. It is managed by the Hampshire and Isle of Wight Wildlife Trust.

This site on Portsea Island has grassland, a wood and a beach. There are saltmarsh plants such as sea purslane, sea aster and common saltmarsh-grass. The wood provides shelter for starlings and house sparrows.

References

Hampshire and Isle of Wight Wildlife Trust